Inaccessible Island is a small rocky island, the northernmost of the Dellbridge Islands, lying  southwest of Cape Evans, Ross Island, Antarctica. It was discovered by the British National Antarctic Expedition (1901–04) under Robert Falcon Scott and so named because of the difficulty in reaching it.

See also 
 Composite Antarctic Gazetteer
 List of Antarctic islands south of 60° S
 Scientific Committee on Antarctic Research
 Territorial claims in Antarctica

References

Citations

Sources 

 

Ross Archipelago